Pitkin County is a county in the U.S. state of Colorado. As of the 2020 census, the population was 17,358. The county seat and largest city is Aspen. The county is named for Colorado Governor Frederick Walker Pitkin. Pitkin County has the seventh-highest per capita income of any U.S. county. Measured by mean income of the top 5% of earners, it is the wealthiest U.S. county.

Pitkin County is included in the Glenwood Springs Micropolitan Statistical Area, which is also included in the Edwards-Glenwood Springs Combined Statistical Area.

Geography

Adjacent counties
Eagle County – northeast
Lake County – east
Chaffee County – southeast
Gunnison County – south
Mesa County – west
Garfield County – northwest

Major highways
  State Highway 82
  State Highway 133

National protected areas
White River National Forest
Collegiate Peaks Wilderness
Holy Cross Wilderness
Hunter-Fryingpan Wilderness
Maroon Bells-Snowmass Wilderness

Trails and byways
American Discovery Trail
Continental Divide National Scenic Trail
West Elk Loop Scenic Byway

Demographics

As of the census of 2000, there were 14,872 people, 6,807 households, and 3,185 families living in the county.  The population density was 15 people per square mile (6/km2).  There were 10,096 housing units at an average density of 10 per square mile (4/km2).  The racial makeup of the county was 94.33% White, 0.53% Black or African American, 0.27% Native American, 1.12% Asian, 0.04% Pacific Islander, 2.37% from other races, and 1.34% from two or more races. Of the population,  6.54% were Hispanic or Latino of any race.

There were 6,807 households, out of which 21.10% had children under the age of 18 living with them, 38.70% were married couples living together, 5.30% had a female householder with no husband present, and 53.20% were non-families. Of all households, 35.80% were made up of individuals, and 3.50% had someone living alone who was 65 years of age or older.  The average household size was 2.14 and the average family size was 2.77.

In the county, the population was spread out, with 16.70% under the age of 18, 7.70% from 18 to 24, 38.30% from 25 to 44, 30.50% from 45 to 64, and 6.80% who were 65 years of age or older.  The median age was 38 years. For every 100 females, there were 115.10 males.  For every 100 females age 18 and over, there were 117.40 males.

The median income for a household in the county was $59,375, and the median income for a family was $75,048. Males had a median income of $40,672 versus $33,896 for females. The per capita income for the county was $40,811.  About 3.00% of families and 6.20% of the population were below the poverty line, including 4.40% of those under age 18 and 5.60% of those age 65 or over.

Life expectancy
According to a report in the Journal of the American Medical Association, residents of Pitkin County had a 2014 life expectancy of 86.52 years, the second-longest in the nation. Both men and women live longer in Pitkin County than nearly every other county in the United States. The life expectancy at birth is 85.2 years for men and 88.0 years for women. Two contiguous counties, Summit and Eagle counties, rank first and third in the nation respectively in life expectancy.

Factors contributing to the high life expectancy in Pitkin County are "high education, high income, high access to medical care, the people are physically active, obesity is lower than anywhere else—so you’re doing it right”, said Ali Mokdad, one of the study's co-authors.

In June 2021, U.S. News & World Report ranked the county with the nation's fourth-best life expectancy, at 93.4 years.

Communities

City
Aspen

Towns
Basalt
Snowmass Village

Census-designated places
Norrie
Redstone
Woody Creek

Other unincorporated communities
Ashcroft
Buttermilk
Meredith
Snowmass

Politics
Pitkin County favored the Republican nominee in the 1884 and 1888 presidential elections, but in 1892 supported the Populist nominee, James B. Weaver, when Democratic nominee Grover Cleveland wasn't on the ballot in Colorado. Pitkin County favored the Democratic nominees from 1896 to 1916, voting for them in every election in that period, and being one of the few Western counties to support Alton B. Parker in 1904. From 1920, Pitkin County followed national trends until being narrowly carried by losing candidate Thomas E. Dewey in 1944. Pitkin was largely Republican-leaning until the growing ski resort community drew its residents to the liberal George McGovern – rejected by a majority of the electorates of all but 129 other counties – in 1972. Like many ski destination counties, since 1988 Pitkin has turned heavily Democratic. The last Republican to carry the county was Ronald Reagan in 1984. George H. W. Bush was the last Republican to gain even a third of Pitkin County's vote since then.

In this modern era, Pitkin has also frequently been one of the leading counties for third-party candidates, being the fourth-best county in the nation for Eugene McCarthy in 1976 and the third-best for John B. Anderson in 1980.

See also

Colorado
Outline of Colorado
Index of Colorado-related articles
Bibliography of Colorado
Geography of Colorado
History of Colorado
Colorado statistical areas
Glenwood Springs, CO Micropolitan Statistical Area
List of counties in Colorado
Pitkin County, Colorado
National Register of Historic Places listings in Pitkin County, Colorado
List of places in Colorado
List of census-designated places in Colorado
List of forts in Colorado
List of ghost towns in Colorado
List of mountain passes in Colorado
List of mountain peaks of Colorado
List of municipalities in Colorado
List of post offices in Colorado
Protected areas of Colorado
Roaring Fork Transportation Authority
Hunter S. Thompson

References

External links

Pitkin County Government website
Colorado County Evolution by Don Stanwyck
Colorado Historical Society

 

 
Colorado counties
1881 establishments in Colorado
Populated places established in 1881